Nancherrow is a TV movie sequel to Rosamunde Pilcher's Coming Home. It aired on ITV television from 4 to 5 April 1999.

Synopsis
After the Colonel dies it is his irrepressible daughter, Loveday, who inherits the house and all of its problems.  Bewitched by the magic of Nancherrow, Loveday fights to keep the estate going so that, in time, her young son Nat may inherit same, while dealing with the reappearance of her one true love Gus and her failing marriage to Walter.
Meanwhile, Judith is finding life as the wife of a busy doctor difficult, especially after suffering multiple miscarriages. It is a time of much change and heartfelt expectation for everyone at Nancherrow.

Cast

 Joanna Lumley as Diana Carey-Lewis
Katie Ryder Richardson as Loveday Carey-Lewis
Lara-Joy Körner as Judith Dunbar
 George Asprey as Jeremy Wells
 Susan Hampshire as Miss Catto
 Patrick Ryecart as Tommy Mortimer
 Philipp Moog as Gus Cullendar
 Tristan Gemmill as Walter
 Robert Hardy as Viscount Berryann
 Lynda Baron as Dashka
Jake Gomme as Younger Nat
Josh Wynter as Older Nat
 Emily Hamilton as Jess
 Simon Dutton as Ronny Cox
 Lucy Robinson as Laura Cox
Paul Curran as Simon Travis
 Samantha Beckinsale as Nesta Carew
 Robert Lang as Jerry Pinch
 Christian Kohlund as Nikko Bernhoffer
 Senta Berger as Alex Gower
 Donald Sinden as Robin Jarvis
 Colin Prockter as The Mayor
Nicola Breeze as Norma
Eric Carte as The Headmaster
Barnaby Wynter as Will Travis
 Michael Cochrane as Sir George Rawlings
 Patrick Macnee as Lord Peter Awliscombe
 Lucy Fleming as The Specialist
Henry Moxon as Stockbridge
Rosanna Wollenberg as Susan
India Martin as Jenny
Derek Bentham as The Auctioneer
Kenneth Harkness as Funeral Bugler

DVD release
Nancherrow is available on DVD in the UK.

References

External links

1999 British television series debuts
1999 British television series endings
1999 German television series debuts
1999 German television series endings
1990s British drama television series
ITV television dramas
ZDF original programming
1990s British television miniseries
1990s German television miniseries
World War II television series
Television shows based on British novels
English-language television shows
English-language German films
Television shows set in Cornwall
Films directed by Simon Langton